Abacetus bifoveatus is a species of ground beetle in the subfamily Pterostichinae. It was described by Straneo in 1963.

References

bifoveatus
Beetles described in 1963